Bilateral relations exist between Australia and the Netherlands. Australia has an embassy in The Hague. The Netherlands has an embassy in Canberra. The two countries communicate and cooperate on a range of issues, including counterterrorism, climate change, human rights, and the Millennium Development Goals. In 2001 the countries signed an agreement on social security for those who have lived or worked in both countries.

During the period 1947–1971 about 160,000 Dutch people emigrated to Australia, and as of 2006 there are around 90,000 Australians of Dutch descent.

Since 2018, the Dutch Ambassador is Ms Marion Derckx.

History 
During the period 1606–1770, Dutch seafarers visited Australia numerous times.

The first recorded European sighting of the Australian mainland, and the first recorded European landfall on the Australian continent (in 1606), are attributed to the Dutch. The first ship and crew to chart the Australian coast and meet with Aboriginal people was the Duyfken captained by Dutch navigator, Willem Janszoon. The Dutch charted the whole of the western and northern coastlines and named the island continent "New Holland" during the 17th century, but made no attempt at settlement. Other Dutch explorers include Abel Tasman and Willem de Vlamingh.

During and immediately post the second world war, the Netherlands East Indies government in exile, was stationed in Wacol, Queensland, and the Netherlands Indies Government Information Service in Melbourne, with the agreement of the then Labor Australian government. Australia was planned as the staging post for re-imposition of colonial rule in Indonesia. However, Australian maritime unions did much to frustrate this, with bans on manning/loading/coaling from September 1946 to a final ending of all bans in July 1949.

Historically, diplomatic issues have arisen over West New Guinea, and Indonesia's independence from the Netherlands (with Australia recognising the Indonesian Republic on 9 July 1947). In 1955, Prime Minister Robert Menzies visited the Netherlands to discuss the issue of West Papua with Dutch officials including the Prime Minister of the Netherlands Willem Drees and Foreign Minister Joseph Luns.

See also 
 Foreign relations of Australia
 Foreign relations of the Netherlands
 Australia–European Union relations
 Dutch Australians

References 

 
Netherlands
Bilateral relations of the Netherlands